Frederick Toby (9 December 1888 – 1963) was an Australian cricketer. He played one first-class match for Tasmania in 1921/22.

See also
 List of Tasmanian representative cricketers

References

External links
 

1888 births
1963 deaths
Australian cricketers
Tasmania cricketers
Cricketers from Sydney